Thalianol synthase ((S)-2,3-epoxysqualene mutase (cyclizing, thalianol-forming)) is an enzyme with systematic name (3S)-2,3-epoxy-2,3-dihydrosqualene mutase (cyclizing, thalianol-forming). This enzyme catalyses the following chemical reaction

 (3S)-2,3-epoxy-2,3-dihydrosqualene  thalianol

References

External links 
 

EC 5.4.99